Maurizio Arena (26 December 1933 – 21 November 1979) was an Italian film actor. He appeared in more than 70 films between 1952 and 1978.

Life and career
Born in Rome as Maurizio Di Lorenzo, Arena made his film debut at nineteen years old, with a small role in Bellezze in moto-scooter. His breakout role came in 1956 with the role of Romolo in the successful Dino Risi's romance-comedy film Poveri ma belli. Until the early 1960s Arena was one of the most popular actors in the Italian cinema, and was a regular feature of gossip columns for his tumultuous personal life. 

In later years his celebrity declined, and Arena found roles as a character actor in smaller films, and occasionally worked as a singer.  He became an alternative medicine healer with some local following. 

He died at age 45 following a heart attack, a complication from a long-standing renal condition.  

In 2008 a park was named after him in his native district Garbatella.

Selected filmography

 La figlia del diavolo (1952) - Corrado
 Beauties on Motor Scooters (1952)
 Siamo tutti inquilini (1953) - Carlo
 Roman Holiday (1953) - Young Boy with Car (uncredited)
 La lupa (1953)
 It Happened in the Park (1953) - Il fidanzato di Virginia (segment: Incidente a Villa Borghese)
 Tormento d'anim (1953)
 A Day in Court (1954) - Lorenzo (uncredited)
 Tripoli, Beautiful Land of Love (1954) - Feruccio
 Peppino e la vecchia signora (1954)
 Totò and Carolina (1955) - Mario, il ladro
 The Sign of Venus (1955) - Maurice
 Roman Tales (1955) - Mario
 Processo all'amore (1955)
 La porta dei sogni (1955) - Silvio
 Accadde di notte (1956)
 Tempo di villeggiatura (1956) - Checco
 Un giglio infranto (1956) - Ferdinando
 Sangue di zingara (1956) - Tore
 Poveri ma belli (1957) - Romolo Toccacieli
 The Black Devil (1957) - Ruggero
 The Man Who Wagged His Tail (1957) - Alfonso
 Belle ma povere (1957) - Romolo Toccacieli
 Vacanze a Ischia (1957) - Franco
 Buongiorno primo amore! (1957) - Giancarlo
 Il cocco di mamma (1958) - Aldo Manca
 Napoli, sole mio! (1958) - Michele Brunati
 The Italians They Are Crazy (1958) - Benedetti
 Valeria ragazza poco seria (1958) - Mario Renzetti
 Love and Troubles (1958) - Roberto
 Via col para... vento (1958) - Alberto Pompei
 Caporale di giornata (1958) - Felice Fornari
 Marinai, donne e guai (1958) - Mario Santarelli
 Avventura a Capri (1959) - Mario
 Poveri milionari (1959) - Romolo
 Noi siamo due evasi (1959) - Brigadiere Francesco Curti
 The Defeated Victor (1959) - Romolo De Santis
 La duchessa di Santa Lucia (1959) - Carlo
 Il magistrato (1959) - Orlando Di Giovanni
 Terror of Oklahoma (1959) - Clay Norton
 Simpatico mascalzone (1959) - Mario
 Policarpo (1959) - il fattorino dei fiori
 Il principe fusto (1960) - Ettore
 Il carabiniere a cavallo (1961) - Renato Gorini
 You Must Be Blonde on Capri (1961) - Roberto Calli
 Maurizio, Peppino e le indossatrici (1961) - Maurizio Innocenzi
 Fra' Manisco cerca guai (1961) - Giulio
 Pugni, pupe e marinai (1961) - Alberto Mariani
 The Legion's Last Patrol (1962) - Dolce Vita
 Il giorno più corto (1962)
 I soliti rapinatori a Milano (1963) - Aldo
 Via Veneto (1964)
 La fuga (1965) - Alberto Spina
 Le bambole (1965) - Massimo (segment "Il Trattato di Eugenetica")
 The Peking Medallion (1967) - Danny
 Gli altri, gli altri... e noi (1967) - Antonio
 They Came to Rob Las Vegas (1968) - Clark
 Agnaldo, Perigo à Vista (1969)
 Mazzabubù... quante corna stanno quaggiù? (1971) - Giuseppe
 Er Più – storia d'amore e di coltello (1971) - Bartolo Di Lorenzo
 Storia di fifa e di coltello - Er seguito d'er più (1972) - Bartolo Di Lorenzo
 Anche se volessi lavorare, che faccio? (1972) - Garrone
 Storia de fratelli e de cortelli (1973) - Nino
 The Assassination of Matteotti (1973) - Communist Activist
 Società a responsabilità molto limitata (1973) - Gateano Stipoli
 The Godson of the Godfather (1973) - Don Vincenzo
 The Balloon Vendor (1974) - Romolo
 To Love Ophelia (1974) - Spartaco Cesaroni
 Loaded Guns (1975) - Padre Best
 Hallucination Strip (1975) - Buscemi, Il Siciliano
 Il sogno di Zorro (1975) - Friar Miguel
 Remo e Romolo (Storia di due figli di una lupa) (1976) - Marte
 The Career of a Chambermaid (1976) - Luciani
 Vai col liscio (1976) - Aldemiro
 Atti impuri all'italiana (1976) - Gedeone - the Mayor
 The Mistress Is Served (1976) - Domenico Cardona
 Puttana galera! (1976) - Marpione
 La Bidonata (1977) - Maurizio
 Pugni, dollari e spinaci (1978) - Sammy Mania

References

External links

1933 births
1979 deaths
Italian male film actors
Male actors from Rome
20th-century Italian male actors
Deaths from kidney disease